Piggy is a 2012 British horror crime film. It is written and directed by Kieron Hawkes, produced by Fulwell 73 and DP Film Productions and starring Martin Compston, Paul Anderson, Ed Skrein and Neil Maskell.

Synopsis
In London, Joe (Compston) enters a depression after his brother is murdered on his way home after a night out, and the police think it looks like an open-and-shut case. However, a man called Piggy (Anderson) arrives claiming to be a mate of the brother and he wants revenge, but is Piggy real or a figment of Joe’s imagination?

Cast
Martin Compston as Joe
Rachel Dylan as Claire
Roland Manookian as Craig
Neil Maskell as John 
Paul Anderson as Piggy
Ed Skrein as Jamie

Production
The film was produced by Danny Potts and Leo Pearlman for Fulwell 73 and DP Film Productions  with Creativity Media, and directed by Kieron Hawkes. Executive Producer’s on the project were Gabe Turner, Joe Moore and Patrick Fischer.

Release
The film had a limited UK cinema release on May 4, 2012.

Reception
On the review aggregator website Rotten Tomatoes, Piggy holds an approval rating of 18% based on 11 reviews.

Critical Reception
Mark Kermode on the Kermode and Mayo's Film Review show on BBC Radio 5Live called it “Death Wish for shoegazers” and “strangely disturbing, ultimately unsatisfying”. The Guardian felt it lacked subtlety but compared Anderson’s swaggering performance to the character of Tyler Durden in Fight Club.

References

External links

2012 films
British horror drama films
2010s English-language films
2012 horror films